Elvi Berisha (born 2 March 1999) is an Albanian professional footballer who plays as a left midfielder for Tirana.

Club career

Early career
Berisha started his youth career at age of 12 with FK Fieri under-13. After spending one season there, he moved at fellow Fieri club KF Apolonia Fier under-15. During the 2014 Summer window transfers, Berisha signed with KF Tirana.

On 20 June 2016 Berisha had a trial by Roma in a Serie D club.

Leganés
On 12 August 2017, Berisha started a trial at Spanish side CD Leganés. In his first trial game with the reserves he scored twice against Guadalajara in a 4–2 win, where he wore the shirt number 7. Following that, the club was convinced to sign him three days later. Berisha agreed a four-year contract joining on a free transfer since he had no professional contract with Tirana. Tirana were, however, entitled to €90,000 due to FIFA's rules that the club where a player was raised earns €30,000 for each year the player was part of the club.

Berisha was subsequently assigned to the B-team in the regional leagues. On 12 November 2017, he scored a hat-trick for the side in a 5–2 home routing of CDV Rayo Serranillos.

International career

Albania U17
Berisha was called up by Albania national under-17 football team coach Džemal Mustedanagić to participate in the 2015 UEFA European Under-17 Championship qualification where Albania U17 was placed in Group 9. He made his debut on 8 October 2014 in the opening match against Norway coming on as a second-half substitute in the 47th minute in place of Gezim Pepsi in an eventual 3–0 defeat. He played also as a second-half substitute in the closing match against San Marino U17 on 13 October replacing Rubin Hebaj in the 60th minute and managed to score a goal in the 74th minute to sign the 5–1 victory.

Berisha was re-called at Albania under-17 by coach Džemal Mustedanagić to participate in the 2016 UEFA European Under-17 Championship qualification from 22–27 October 2015. He played 1 match as a starter against Netherlands U17 on 24 October and was substituted off in the half-time for Arlind Demaj.

Albania U19
He was called up at Albania national under-19 football team by coach Arjan Bellaj to participate in the 2017 UEFA European Under-19 Championship qualification from 6–11 October 2016. He was an unused substitute in the opening match against Republic of Ireland U19 and played two full 90-minutes matches against Germany U19 in 3–2 loss and against Gibraltar U19 in a 1–0 victory.

Berisha was re-called at Albania under-19 by new coach Erjon Bogdani for a gathering in Durrës, Albania in April 2017 where they also played two friendly matches.

Career statistics

Club

Honours

Club 
Tirana
Albanian Supercup: 2022

References

External links
Elvi Berisha profile FSHF.org

1999 births
Living people
Sportspeople from Fier
Albanian footballers
Association football midfielders
KF Apolonia Fier players
KF Tirana players
CD Leganés players
KF Laçi players
KF Skënderbeu Korçë players
Albanian expatriate footballers
Albanian expatriate sportspeople in Spain
Expatriate footballers in Spain